is a Japanese animator, character designer, and illustrator. She is married to anime director and animator Tomohiro Hirata, with whom she also collaborated in the Trinity Blood anime (in which Nakajima was character designer and Hirata was director).

Ms. Nakajima is strongly associated with the animated adaptations of the works of Rumiko Takahashi produced by Kitty Films, having worked as an animation director on Urusei Yatsura, Ranma ½ and Maison Ikkoku and as a character designer on Ranma ½.

Filmography
 Cookin' Idol I! My! Mine! (TV): character designer
 Fruits Basket (TV): genga artist
 GetBackers (TV): animation director, character designer
 Haunted Junction (TV): character designer
 Jin Roh: animator
 Komi Can't Communicate (TV): character designer
 Maison Ikkoku (TV): animation director
 Maria-sama ga Miteru second season onward: character designer for the ED sequence, promotional pictures
 Mon Colle Knights (TV): character designer
 Oh My Goddess! The Movie: animator
 Princess Princess (TV): character designer
 Project A-ko: animator
 Ranma ½: animation director, character designer
 Rurouni Kenshin (TV): animation director
 Sword Gai Sword: The Animation (ONA): character designer
 The Irresponsible Captain Tylor: animator
 Tokyo Ghoul:re (TV): character designer
 Trinity Blood (TV): character designer
 Urusei Yatsura (TV): animation director
 Urusei Yatsura 1: Only You: in between artist
 Urusei Yatsura 3: Remember My Love: animator
 Urusei Yatsura 4: Lum the Forever: animator
 You're Under Arrest: character designer
 You're Under Arrest: The Movie: character designer
 You're Under Arrest: Full Throttle: character designer
 Violinist of Hameln (TV): character designer

References

 Nakagami, Yoshikatsu et al. (December 2007). "You're Under Arrest: Full Throttle". Newtype USA. pp. 48–49.

External links
 
 

Anime character designers
Japanese animators
Japanese women animators
Japanese women illustrators
1961 births
Living people